Toko Merah (Indonesian "Red Shop") is a Dutch colonial landmark in Jakarta Old Town, Indonesia. Built in 1730, it is one of the oldest buildings in Jakarta. The building is located on the west side of the main canal Kali Besar. The building's red color contributes to its current name.

One of the famous guests of the building Toko Merah is William Bligh.

History
Toko Merah was built in 1730 as the residence of the Governor-General of the Dutch East Indies Gustaaf Willem, Baron van Imhoff (1743-1750) above a 2.471 square meter plot. From 1743 to 1755, the building served as a Navy Academy (Dutch Academie de Marine), reputed to be the oldest navy academy in Asia.

Afterwards, this building changed its ownership several times. It has been a residence of other Governors-General of the Dutch East Indies: Jacob Mossel (1750–1761), Petrus Albertus van der Parra (1761–1775), Reynier de Klerck (1777–1780), Nicolaas Hartingh, and Baron von Hohendorff.

The building was converted into a hotel from 1786 to 1808; the manager of the hotel built rows of carriage houses and stables to keep the hotel's eight carriages and its sixteen horses. These additional buildings were later converted into row houses. During the period, the building Toko Merah also provided six boats on the Kali Besar to transport goods from the Sunda Kelapa harbor. In 1851, the building was purchased by Oey Liauw Kong, Kapitein der Chinezen of Batavia, for use as his residence and shop, and was painted red, and so it was known as Toko Merah.

The building was restored by J.F. van Hoytema in 1920. It was the office for the Bank voor Indië between 1920 and 1940. Afterwards, the building was used as the office of Jacobson van den Berg, an international Dutch-owned company.

After the nationalization of Dutch companies in 1957, Toko Merah became an office for various state-owned enterprises e.g. PT. Satya Niaga (1972)

The aim is to restore Toko Merah as a conference hall and a commercial gallery.  The plan is that current (mid-2012) restorations will be complete by the end of 2012.

Architecture
The architecture style of the building follows the earliest period of Dutch colonial architecture. The style were basically the tropical counterparts of 17th century Dutch architecture. Typical features include the typically Dutch high sash windows with split shutters, and gable roofs. The building was solidly built with relatively enclosed structures, a structure that is not very friendly to tropical climate as compared to the Dutch colonial architecture of the next period in Jakarta.

Surrounding area
The building is located in Jakarta Old Town, the historic center of Jakarta. It is within a walkable distance from other cultural heritage displaying the history Batavia e.g. Jakarta History Museum, Wayang Museum, and the Sunda Kelapa harbor.

See also
 List of colonial buildings and structures in Jakarta
 Tambora, Jakarta

References

Cited works

Buildings and structures in Jakarta
Colonial architecture in Jakarta
1730 establishments in Asia
Cultural Properties of Indonesia in Jakarta
1730 establishments in the Dutch Empire
Buildings and structures completed in 1730